The 2019 Super Provincial One Day Tournament was a List A cricket tournament that was played in Sri Lanka between 4 and 11 April 2019. Four teams took part in the competition: Colombo, Dambulla, Galle and Kandy, with Galle being the defending champions.

Initially, Sri Lanka Cricket (SLC) said that players would only be considered for the 2019 Cricket World Cup if they played in this tournament. Lasith Malinga was originally expected to play in the tournament and miss out on some part of the 2019 Indian Premier League (IPL). The SLC then changed its stance, granting permission for Malinga to miss the tournament and play in the IPL. However, days before the start of the tournament, Malinga was listed as playing in a press release issued by Sri Lanka Cricket. Malinga played for Galle in the opening fixture of the tournament, the day after appearing for the Mumbai Indians in the IPL. In the match against Kandy, he took seven wickets for 49 runs, his best figures in List A cricket.

Following the conclusion of the round-robin matches, Galle and Colombo had progressed to the tournament final. Dambulla won the third place play-off match, after they beat Kandy by 94 runs. The final finished as a no result, after rain stopped play during the innings break, therefore Colombo and Galle shared the title. Angelo Mathews was named the best batsman of the tournament, Lasith Malinga the best bowler and Dhananjaya de Silva was named the player of the tournament.

Squads
The following teams and squads were named to compete in the tournament:

Points table

 Teams qualified for the final

Fixtures

Round-robin

Finals

References

External links
 Series home at ESPN Cricinfo

Super Provincial One Day Tournament